4707 Khryses  is a larger Jupiter trojan from the Trojan camp, approximately  in diameter. It was discovered on 13 August 1988, by American astronomer Carolyn Shoemaker at the Palomar Observatory in California. The assumed C-type asteroid has a rotation period 6.9 hours and likely an elongated shape. It was named after the Trojan priest Chryses (Khryseis) from Greek mythology.

Orbit and classification 

Khryses is a Jupiter trojan in a 1:1 orbital resonance with Jupiter. It is located in the trailering Trojan camp at the Gas Giant's  Lagrangian point, 60° behind its orbit . It orbits the Sun at a distance of 4.6–5.8 AU once every 11 years and 10 months (4,322 days; semi-major axis of 5.19 AU). Its orbit has an eccentricity of 0.12 and an inclination of 7° with respect to the ecliptic. The body's observation arc begins with a precovery taken at Palomar in August 1953, or 35 years prior to its official discovery observation.

Naming 

This minor planet was named after Trojan Chryses (Khryseis), a priest of Apollo. His daughter Chryseis (Khryseis) was abducted by Agamemnon during the Trojan War. Apollo then sent a plague sweeping through the Greek camp, forcing Agamemnon to give back the priest's daughter. The official naming citation was published by the Minor Planet Center on 28 April 1991.

Physical characteristics 

Khryses is an assumed, carbonaceous C-type asteroid. Most Jupiter trojans are D-types, with the remainder being mostly C- and P-type asteroids.

Rotation period 

Since 2013, several rotational lightcurves of Khryses have been obtained from photometric observations by Daniel Coley and Robert Stephens at the Center for Solar System Studies in Landers, California. Best-rated lightcurve by Daniel Coley from four nights of observations in 2017 gave a well-defined rotation period of  hours with a brightness amplitude of 0.41 magnitude, which indicates that the body has a non-spherical shape.

Diameter and albedo 

According to the survey carried out by the NEOWISE mission of NASA's Wide-field Infrared Survey Explorer, Khryses measures 37.77 kilometers in diameter and its surface has an albedo of 0.086, while the Collaborative Asteroid Lightcurve Link assumes a standard albedo for a carbonaceous asteroid of 0.057 and calculates a diameter of 42.23 kilometers based on an absolute magnitude of 10.6.

Notes

References

External links 
 Asteroid Lightcurve Database (LCDB), query form (info )
 Dictionary of Minor Planet Names, Google books
 Discovery Circumstances: Numbered Minor Planets (1)-(5000) – Minor Planet Center
 Asteroid 4707 Khryses at the Small Bodies Data Ferret
 
 

004707
Discoveries by Carolyn S. Shoemaker
Named minor planets
19880813